Cakanovac is a village located in the municipality of Preševo, Serbia. According to the 2002 census, the village has a population of 221 people. Of these, 186 (84,16 %) were Serbs, 32 (14,47 %) were ethnic Albanians, and 3 (1,35 %) Macedonians.

References

Populated places in Pčinja District
Preševo
Albanian communities in Serbia